Chateaubriand may refer to
François-René de Chateaubriand (1768–1848), French writer and statesman
Chateaubriand steak
Assis Chateaubriand (1892–1968), Brazilian journalist and politician
Assis Chateaubriand, municipality in the state of Paraná in the Southern Region of Brazil
Rodovia Assis Chateaubriand, Brazilian road
Le Chateaubriand, Parisian restaurant

See also
Châteaubriant (disambiguation)